Gau East Prussia (German: Ostpreußen) was an administrative division of Nazi Germany encompassing the province of East Prussia in the Free State of Prussia from 1933 to 1945. Before that, from 1925 to 1933, it was the regional subdivision of the Nazi Party in that area, having been established at a conference in Königsberg on 6 December 1925. In 1939, Gau East Prussia expanded following the annexation of the Klaipėda Region from Lithuania and the occupation of Poland, while a sliver of territory from the gau was transferred to Reichsgau Danzig-West Prussia. After Germany's attack on the USSR, the Belarusian city of Hrodna also became part of the Gau.

After the war, the territory of the former Gau became part of the Russian SFSR exclave of Kaliningrad in the Soviet Union, major sections were given to Poland, and the area of the Klaipėda Region was returned to the Lithuanian SSR and Hrodna - to the Belarusian SSR within the Soviet Union.

History
The Nazi Gau (plural Gaue) system was originally established in a party conference on 22 May 1926, in order to improve administration of the party structure. From 1933 onward, after the Nazi seizure of power, the Gaue increasingly replaced the German states as administrative subdivisions in Germany.

At the head of each Gau stood a Gauleiter, a position which became increasingly more powerful, especially after the outbreak of the Second World War, with little interference from above. Local Gauleiters often held government positions as well as party ones and were in charge of, among other things, propaganda and surveillance and, from September 1944 onward, the Volkssturm and the defense of the Gau.

The position of Gauleiter in East Prussia was held by Wilhelm Stich from 1925 to 1926, Bruno Gustav Scherwitz from 1926 to 1927, Hans Albert Hohnfeldt (acting) from 1927 to 1928 and Erich Koch from 1 October 1928 to the end of the Nazi regime.

See also
 Gauliga Ostpreußen, the highest association football league in the Gauliga from 1933 to 1945

References

External links
 Illustrated list of Gauleiter

Eastern Hanover
1933 establishments in Germany
1945 disestablishments in Germany
East Prussia